The 1965 VMI Keydets football team was an American football team that represented the Virginia Military Institute (VMI) as a member of the Southern Conference (SoCon) during the 1965 NCAA University Division football season. In their 13th year under head coach John McKenna, the team compiled an overall record of 3–7 with a mark of 3–2 in conference play, placing fourth in the SoCon.

Schedule

References

VMI
VMI Keydets football seasons
VMI Keydets football